Rodis Kanakaris-Roufos (Greek: Ρόδης Κανακάρης-Ρούφος, 1924–1972) was a Greek diplomat and writer.

Biography
He was the son of Loukas Kanakaris-Roufos and a member of the Rouphos family that descended from Sicily and the rest of southern Italy and were politicians from Patras and Achaea.  He studied law at the University of Athens in 1949 and also became a foreign minister.  He made diplomatic representations in Vienna in Nicosia and in Paris.  He took part in the Greek resistance but in 1967 with the arrival of the Regime of the Colonels that took power until 1974, Rodis Kanakaris lost his place.

He had been awarded the Twelve Awards in which along with the National Novel Awards.  After his novel Poreia sto skotadi (Πορεία στο σκοτάδι), he was awarded the Kostas Ouranis Award.

He died in Kolonaki in Athens in 1972 and had two sons, including Loukas (1949-    ) who became a lawyer, and Athanassios (1952-   ) who is a musician.

Bibliography
During his lifetime, he wrote several works with his pseudonym Rodis Provelengios or Proveleggios (Ρόδης Προβελέγγιος).  Some of his works include:

References
The first version of the article is translated and is based from the article at the Greek Wikipedia (el:Main Page)

1924 births
1972 deaths
National and Kapodistrian University of Athens alumni
Greek diplomats
20th-century Greek novelists
Writers from Patras
Roufos family